SkyPark at Santa's Village is an Outdoor Adventure Park with year-round mountain biking, hiking, fly fishing and open air activities in the Skyforest section of Lake Arrowhead, California. At the core of SkyPark is The Village, which includes historic log cabin restaurants and shops, seasonal entertainment, and open-air activities. SkyPark’s conservation program includes the Henck Meadowlands Conservation Trail, Conservation Hikes, and Outdoor Educational Programs for school-age children.  of the park have been preserved in their pristine condition to remain unused. SkyPark at Santa's Village opened on December 2, 2016.

This Santa's Village opened in 1955 and closed in 1998.

The others, also defunct, were in Scotts Valley, California and East Dundee, Illinois. The latter opened in 1959 and closed in 2006, but reopened in 2011 under new ownership as Santa's Village AZoosment Park.

Opening more than a month before Disneyland, the  park was one of Southern California's biggest tourist attractions. It had kiddie rides, including a bobsled, monorail, and Ferris wheel. It also had a petting zoo, live reindeer and shops including a bakery, candy kitchen and toy shop.

Reduced attendance and revenue shortfalls caused the park to close on March 1, 1998.  The property sold three years later for $5.6 million, and served as a staging area for logging operations. The faded candy cane signpost and dilapidated buildings became a ghost town along the Rim of the World Highway.

In June 2014, the park was sold to a new owner who planned to operate it as a year-round tourist destination called SkyPark at Santa's Village. After renovations of 18 original Santa's Village buildings and restoration projects in the surrounding forest, it reopened on December 2, 2016 as an outdoor adventure park:  SkyPark at Santa's Village.

References

External links

Santa’s Village Theme Parks History
Santa's Village on Modern Day Ruins

Santa Claus
1955 establishments in California
1998 disestablishments in California
2016 establishments in California
Articles containing video clips
Amusement parks opened in 1955